Warden is the surname of:

 Allen F. Warden (1852–1927), American politician and newspaper editor
 David Bailie Warden (1772–1845), Irish republican insurgent, US consul and academic
 Don Warden (1929–2017), American country steel guitarist and manager of Porter Wagoner and Dolly Parton
 Elizabeth Warden (swimmer) (born 1978), Canadian swimmer
 Eric Warden (born 1992), Ghanaian footballer 
 Florence Warden (1857–1929), English actress and novelist
 Frederick Warden (1807–1869), Royal Navy rear-admiral, Commander-in-Chief of the Channel Fleet
 George Warden, an alias of Big Nose George (1834–1881), American Old West cattle rustler and highwayman
 Henry Douglas Warden (1800–1856), British Resident of the Orange River Sovereignty, founder of Bloemfontein
 Henry Edward Warden (1915–2007), United States Air Force colonel, often credited as the "Father of the B-52" bomber
 Jack Warden (1920–2006), American character actor
 John Warden (disambiguation)
 Jon Warden (born 1946), American Major League Baseball pitcher
 Kathy J. Warden (born 1970/71), American business executive, chief executive officer and president of Northrop Grumman
 May Warden (1891–1978), British actress
 Peter Warden (born 1941), British former hurdler and former National Coach
 William Warden (printer) (1761–1786), American printer in Boston, Massachusetts
 William Warden (Royal Navy officer) (1777–1849), Scottish naval surgeon who published a popular account of his conversations with Napoleon
 Winter Warden (1860–1936), Australian politician

See also
 Worden (disambiguation), which includes a list of people with the surname or given name

English-language surnames
Occupational surnames
English-language occupational surnames